WISE-FTP is an FTP client for Microsoft Windows that is developed and distributed by the German company AceBIT, located in Darmstadt. Apart from using the normal FTP protocol, Wise-FTP supports the SSH (SFTP) and FTPS (FTP/SSL) protocols, as well as the SSL and TLS cryptographic protocols. Transfers can be carried out via drag and drop, as the program interface is based on Windows Explorer.

The current version is Wise-FTP 8. The program interface is available in German, English, French and Spanish.

WISE-FTP has been included in all web hosting packages provided by 1&1 Internet since 2000, and the packages of T-Online since 2004.

Using Wise-FTP files can be encrypted and compressed for the transfer.
The program is able to upload and download multiple files simultaneously – e.g. to different FTP servers. A direct transfer from one FTP server to another is also possible.
A macro recorder allows to record frequently used sequences of commands and run them subsequently as often as you wish. In addition, Wise-FTP has a Task Planner which allows to schedule file transfers.

With the integrated HTML editor, HTML or text files can be changed on the FTP server. The synchronization of folders and subfolders between the local and remote system can be done as well.

See also 
Comparison of FTP client software

References

External links 
 AceBIT Website
 WISE-FTP Website

FTP clients